Tiziana Realini (born 3 March 1984) is a Swiss equestrian. She competed in the individual eventing at the 2008 Summer Olympics.

References

External links
 

1984 births
Living people
Swiss female equestrians
Olympic equestrians of Switzerland
Equestrians at the 2008 Summer Olympics
People from Locarno
Sportspeople from Ticino